Giambrone is am Italian surname. Notable people with the surname include:

Adam Giambrone (born 1977), Canadian politician and transportation consultant
Jean Giambrone (1921–2013), American sportswriter
Sean Giambrone (born 1999), American actor

Italian-language surnames